Curral Velho is a settlement in the northern part of the island of Santiago, Cape Verde. It is part of the municipality of Tarrafal. In 2010 its population was 358. It is located 1 km north of Locotano and 11 km southeast of Tarrafal, on the Praia-Assomada-Tarrafal Road (EN1-ST01).

References

Villages and settlements in Santiago, Cape Verde
Tarrafal Municipality